Pseudomonas xanthomarina is a bacterium found in marine ascidians. Unlike many other members of the genus Pseudomonas, it is not fluorescent.

References

Further reading

External links
Type strain of Pseudomonas xanthomarina at BacDive -  the Bacterial Diversity Metadatabase

Pseudomonadales
Bacteria described in 2005